Sanjay Arora is an Indian filmmaker and Actor. He is known for making films such as Expression, Chase, Butterfly Wings, Once Again.

Early life
Sanjay Arora was born in Kurukshetra, India . As a child he loved watching Hindi films and acting in skits and plays. He started as a host at the All India Radio, and hosted many programs targeting Indian youth. He did his schooling from Senior Model School, Kurukshetra and went ahead to do Electronics Engineering at D C R University of Science and Technology in Haryana and graduated with a Bachelor's degree. After that he did PG in Export Marketing and Management from Kurukshetra University. He moved to Detroit, Michigan in 1999, and started working as Software Engineer. Even though he was working as a software engineer, his passion was always in acting and film making. He studied filmmaking & direction at New York Film Academy in New York City. He attended the India Today Acting School in Toronto, where he was trained by Roshan Taneja.

Film career
Arora invested the money he made from his engineering career in USA in producing and directing a short film Butterfly Wings. It is based on a true story of a Physically challenged woman. The film was shot in Delhi with Indian and American actors. The film was featured at We Care Film Festival Film Festival, 2011 and screened at 15 cities in India including, Delhi, Mumbai, Allahabad, Jaipur, Goa, Gurgaon and special shows in United Nation Information Center, Delhi and BHEL, Haridwar. Film was screened at Picture this Film Festival, Calgary, West Virginia Filmmaker Festival 2011, West Virginia (USA ), Trinity Film Coalition Film Festival, Detroit, 2011(USA).

Other films
Once Again (Phir vehi) which is inspired from teaching of buddha was screened at Delhi International Film Festival. Expression, as the name suggests, is about expressing internal feelings without verbal language. This film shows that language is not a barrier in love, centring on Karan, an American born Indian from America and Sonya, a Russian bartender in Moscow. It was shot in Detroit, USA with Indian and Russian actors, was screened in ICE short film festival, Pune, and World Music & Independent Film Festival (WMIFF) 2012.  Chase is about a young man actively seeks happiness. Happiness eludes him, but keeps on dropping hints. It was shot in New York city.

Filmography
 Expression (2006) (Short Film) – Producer, actor, director
 Chase (2008) (Short Film) Producer, director
 Butterfly Wings (2010) (Short Film) Producer, director
 Shuttlecock Boys (2011), Assistant Director
 Once Again (2012) Producer, Writer and director

Awards and nominations 
Butterfly Wings
 Honorable Mention award at the Bayou City Inspirational Film Festival (BCIFF) 2011 in Houston, Texas.
 2nd prize for the Best Film at the Global Film Festival, Noida (India).
 Nominated for the Best feature film, Screenplay and Best Supporting Role Actress in feature film at the World Music & Independent Film Festival (WMIFF) 2011, Washington D.C.
 Nominated for the Best Screenplay in a feature film, Best Director and Best Actress in a feature film at The Hot Media International Film Festival (HIMFF) 2012 in Maryland (USA).
 Award of Merit for Short Film at the Accolade Film Competition 2013, USA.
 Honorable Mention Award at the International Film Festival of Spirituality, Religion and Visionary 2013.

Once Again
 Official selection at the Delhi International Film Festival 2012.
 Nominated for the Best Screenplay at the Hot Media International Film Festival 2012.
 Official Selection at the Trinity International Film Festival 2013, Detroit, USA.
 Won Best film award in Religious/Spiritual category at the Great Lakes International Film Festival 2013.
 Won Best Screenplay Award at the Free Spirit Film Festival 2013, India.
 Honorable Mention award at the International Film Festival for Peace, Inspiration & Equality (IFFPIE) 2013 in Jakarta, Indonesia.
 3rd prize winner at the 6th Boomtown Film & Music Festival 2013, Texas.
 Nominated or the Best South East Asian Film and Best Director at the World Music & Independent Film Festival 2013, Washington D.C.
 Honorable Mention Award at the International Film Festival of Spirituality, Religion and Visionary 2013.
 Won "Silver Award  - Short film competition" at the 2014 California Film Awards, USA.
 Won "Royal Reel Award" at the Canada International Film Festival 2014.

References

External links
 Official Website
 

1976 births
Living people
Hindi-language film directors
Film directors from Haryana
Hindi film producers